Valencian Marxist Front, an underground communist group in the Valencian Community, Spain, founded in 1954 by youth active in Lo Rat Penat. It disappeared in 1962, when its members joined either the Valencian Socialist Party or the Communist Party of Spain (later forming the Communist Party of the Valencian Country).

FMV had a left-wing nationalist line, promoting Valencian identity. Leading members included Francesc Codonyer and Enric Tàrrega.

References

 Sanz, Benito; Miquel Nadal (1995). El partit socialista valencià, mès que un partit. El valencianisme al segle XX. pp. 70–72.
 Sanz, Benito (2002). «La primera oposición al franquismo en la Universidad de Valencia a final de los años 50» (pdf). Rojos y Demócratas: La oposición al franquismo en la Universidad de Valencia (1939-1975). Valencia: Albatros. .

Political parties established in 1954
Political parties disestablished in 1962
Communist parties in Spain
Political parties in the Valencian Community
Anti-Francoism